La Voix des Femmes may refer to:

 La Voix des Femmes (France, 1848), feminist periodical
 La Voix des femmes (France, 1917), feminist periodical